The Turkvision Song Contest 2015 was the third edition of the Turkvision Song Contest, which took place in Istanbul, Turkey; and organised by Turkish Music Box Television (TMB). A total of twenty-one Turkic regions, which have either a large Turkic population or a widely spoken Turkic language, participated in the contest, as well as one Turkic ethnic groups who do not have a defined region. There was no semi-final this year, whilst the final took place on 19 December 2015.

Location

On 22 November 2014, it was announced that the hosts for Turkvision 2015 would have been Turkmenistan. Mary, the capital city of Mary Province in Turkmenistan, had been previously chosen as the host city. However, on 21 February 2015 it was announced that the host city had been changed and the contest would then take place in Ashgabat. In late August 2015, the host city was changed yet again to Istanbul, Turkey.

The contest was held in the Yahya Kemal Beyatli Cultural Centre, in Istanbul, Turkey. The centre has 10,000 covered seats of 30,000 seats at total in Küçükçekmece district of Istanbul.

Format

National host broadcaster
Unlike the previous two editions, there was no semi-final held for the 2015 edition. The final took place on 19 December 2015, and was organised by the host broadcaster Turkish Music Box Television (TMB).

National jury members

Each participating country is represented by one jury member, confirmed as being on the jury were:

  – Avni Qahili
  – Isa Melikov
  – Gunesh Abasova
  – Ahmed Švrakić
  – Erhan Hüseyin
  – Piotr Petkovic
  – Volkan Gucer
  – Afik Novruzov
  – Mesut Barış
  – Yalman Hacarov
  – Bolat Mazhagulov
  – Kanatbek Kultaev
  – Reşit İsmet Krüezi
  – Sedat Azizoglu
  – Ertan Birinci
  – Nejat Sali
  – Denis Mavrić
  – Ömer Gürcan
  – Cengiz Erdem
  – Madejda Malenkova
  – Çokay Koçar

Participants
Twenty-one Turkic regions, which have either a large Turkic population or a widely spoken Turkic language, participated in the contest which took place on 19 December 2015. Below are the details of each of the participants.

Other awards 
In addition to the contest winner, there were also three other awards presented during the show. These were as follows:

Broadcasters
Each of the participating broadcasters is expected to broadcast the contest live. The broadcasters that are confirmed so far are:

  – Tring TV
  – ATV Azerbaijan
  – Hayat TV – 19 December at 20:00 CET
  – GRT Television
  – Marnueli Television
  – 
  – Türkmeneli TV
  – Khabar TV – 19 December at 21:00 (17:00 CET)
  – KTRK
  – MRT 2
  – Kibris Genc Television
  – Alpha Media TV
  – RTV Novi Pazar
  – TMB TV, ATV, Ordu Boztepe TV, Kral TV
  – ODTRK Odessa, Yuzhnaya Volna TV

Other regions

The following list of regions participated in the past but did not compete in 2015:

 – On 28 November it was announced that Altai Republic would withdraw from the contest due to the current state of international relations between the Russian Federation and Turkey.

 – On 30 November it was announced that Bashkortostan would withdraw from the contest due to the current state of international relations between the Russian Federation and Turkey. Despite this Bashkortostan did select Ziliya Bachtieva to represent them in 2015.

 – On 30 November it was announced that Crimea would withdraw from the contest due to the current state of international relations between the Russian Federation and Turkey. Despite this Crimea did select Safiye Denishaeva with the song "Aqın Dostlar" to represent them in 2015.

 &  – On 30 November it was announced that Kabardino-Balkaria & Karachay-Cherkessia would withdraw from the contest due to the current state of international relations between the Russian Federation and Turkey. Despite this Kabardino-Balkaria & Karachay-Cherkessia did select Islam Appayev with the song "Unutma meni" to represent them in 2015.

 – On 30 November it was announced that Khakassia would withdraw from the contest due to the current state of international relations between the Russian Federation and Turkey. Despite this Khakassia did select Sayana Saburova & Olga Vasilyeva to represent them in 2015.

 – On 17 December it was announced that Kumyks would not debut at the contest due to the current state of international relations between the Russian Federation and Turkey. Despite this Kumyks did select Gulmira, Fatima and Kamilya with the song "Alğa!" to represent them in 2015.

 – On 30 November it was announced that Moscow would withdraw from the contest due to the current state of international relations between the Russian Federation and Turkey. Despite this Moscow did select Zuleyha İlbakova with the song "Belekey qiź" to represent them in 2015.

 – On 3 December it was announced that Stavropol Krai would not debut at the contest due to the current state of international relations between the Russian Federation and Turkey. Despite this Stavropol Krai did select İslam Satırov with the song "Tuvgan erym" ( (Native land)) to represent them in 2015.

 – In December 2015, it was announced that Tatarstan would withdraw from the contest due to the state of international relations between the Russian Federation and Turkey. Tatarstan had selected the song "Siña kaytam", performed by Yamle, to represent them in 2015.

 – On 30 November it was announced that Tuva would withdraw from the contest due to the current state of international relations between the Russian Federation and Turkey. Despite this Tuva did select Arjaana Stal-ool with the song "Tuvam" to represent them in 2015.

 – On 1 December it was announced that Yakutia would withdraw from the contest due to the current state of international relations between the Russian Federation and Turkey. Despite this Yakutia did select Dalaana to represent them in 2015.

Whilst these countries were rumored to debut, but did not enter:

 – Hungary sent a delegation to the Capital of Culture's opening ceremony in Merv, Turkmenistan. However, none of the Hungarian broadcasters have made any official announcement regarding their début.

  – The Republic of Kalmykia also sent a delegation to Merv, Turkmenistan; hosts of the Capital of Culture's opening ceremony. However, GTRK Kalmykia, the broadcaster of Kalmykia, has not made any official announcement regarding their début.

See also
 Bala Turkvision Song Contest 2015
 Eurovision Song Contest 2015
 Junior Eurovision Song Contest 2015
 Eurovision Young Dancers 2015
 ABU TV Song Festival 2015
 ABU Radio Song Festival 2015

References

External links
  
 Official website in Russian 

2015 in Turkey
Turkish music
Turkvision Song Contest by year
2015 song contests
December 2015 events in Turkey